Events in the year 1645 in Norway.

Incumbents
Monarch: Christian IV

Events

13 August - The Treaty of Brömsebro resulted in the ceding of the Norwegian provinces of Jemtland and Herjedalen to Sweden.

Arts and literature

Births

Deaths

See also

References